Four Songs by Arthur Russell is a tribute EP of songs written by Arthur Russell, featuring Vera November, Jens Lekman, Taken By Trees, and Joel Gibb.

Track listing
"Our Last Night Together" (Vera November)
"A Little Lost" (Jens Lekman)
"Make 1, 2" (Taken By Trees)
"That's Us/Wild Combination" (Joel Gibb)

2007 compilation albums
2007 EPs
Indie rock compilation albums
Indie rock EPs
Tribute albums
Rough Trade Records EPs
Rough Trade Records compilation albums